Mark Rowden (born in 1979) is an Australian printmaker.

Training 
Rowden was born in Margate, England and received a Bachelor of Arts at the National Art School, Sydney. He trained and worked under Master Printer Diana Davidson at Whaling Road studios, one of Sydney oldest fine art editioning studios. He printed the first ever prints of Adam Cullen
and Mclean Edwards, he worked with some notable artist Charles Blackman, Martin Sharp & Peter Kingston

Exhibitions 
He has shown throughout sydney and Melbourne, and is represented by PG gallery, Melbourne.

External links

 Australian Prints + Printmaking  
 Contemporary Notables of the name Rowden 
 Something you said: Review 
 2SER Radio 
 Wagga Wagga Regional Gallery Print Collection 
 Bon á Tirer : Diana Davidson and the Whaling Road Print Studio, 1978–2005. State Library 
 Mark's website  
 PG Gallery 

Living people
1979 births
Australian printmakers